Granite Range may refer to:

 Granite Range (Alaska) in Alaska, USA
 Granite Range (Montana) in Montana, USA
 Granite Range (Elko County) in Nevada, USA
 Granite Range (Washoe County) in Nevada, USA

See also
Granite Mountain (disambiguation)
Granite Mountains (disambiguation)